Dolichoderus ghilianii is a species of ant in the genus Dolichoderus. Described by Emery in 1894, the species is endemic to Brazil,  and Peru.

References

Dolichoderus
Hymenoptera of South America
Insects described in 1894